Man's Woman may refer to:

 Man's Woman (1917 film), American silent film
 Man's Woman (1945 film), Swedish film